The Tour du Guet is a 13th-century watchtower in Calais, Pas-de-Calais, northern France. The tower dates from 1214, when Philip I, Count of Boulogne built fortifications in the town. Damaged by a 1580 earthquake, it was used as a lighthouse until 1848, when it became a watch tower. During World War I, it served as a military post.

References

Towers in France
Buildings and structures in Calais
Monuments and memorials in the Pas-de-Calais
Buildings and structures completed in 1214
Towers completed in the 13th century
1214 in Europe
1210s in France
Monuments historiques of Pas-de-Calais
Brick Gothic
Gothic architecture in France